Edwin Fitler Academics Plus School is a historic school located in the Germantown neighborhood of Philadelphia, Pennsylvania. It is part of the School District of Philadelphia. The building was built in 1897–1898 and is a 3 1/2-story, schist building in the Gothic-style. It features a projecting battlement tower, round arched openings, and three projecting gables.

The building was added to the National Register of Historic Places in 1986.

References

External links

School buildings on the National Register of Historic Places in Philadelphia
Gothic Revival architecture in Pennsylvania
School buildings completed in 1898
1898 establishments in Pennsylvania
Germantown, Philadelphia
School District of Philadelphia
Public K–8 schools in Philadelphia